IDCE Business School (Institute for the Development of Consulting and Enterprise, Institut pour le Développement du Conseil et de l'Entreprise) is a college and graduate school located in Angers, France. It is the business school of the Catholic University of the West, one of the most prestigious French schools.

History 

The IDCE was created in 1987 with the help of the General Council of the Maine-et-Loire and the Economical Development Committee of the Maine-et-Loire. It is specialized in Economics and Business Management.

Organization 

The institute offers graduate and undergraduate degrees:

Graduate degrees

 The Certificate of management consulting, in French, in Angers 
 The MBA in Consulting, in English, in Angers  
 The MBA in International Business, in English, in Angers

Undergraduate degrees

 Licence en Economie, Gestion et Ethique de l'Entreprise, in French, in Angers
  The BBA in International Business, in English, in Angers
  The option: Dual BBA Degree with a major in European Business (St. Edward's University, Austin, Texas, USA and IDCE, UCO)

Business schools in France
Universities and colleges in France